Emissaries of Divine Light is an intentional community initiated by Lloyd Arthur Meeker in 1932. The foundational premise of the network is that human beings' true qualities can only be known as they are expressed in practical daily living. The mission of Emissaries of Divine Light, as cited in its articles of incorporation, is to assist in the spiritual regeneration of humanity under the inspiration of the divine spirit. Meeker saw the work of the Emissaries as an approach to spirituality that transcends physical and mental disciplines, and offers human beings the opportunity to experience their true identity by giving expression to the qualities of spirit that align with their divine nature.

History

Beginnings
Lloyd Arthur Meeker was born on February 25, 1907. By 1929 he had already begun to experiment with Attunement. Emissaries of Divine Light dates its origin to Meeker’s spiritual awakening on September 16, 1932. On three successive evenings, Meeker had been compelled to write and, as he did so, he was said to have experienced a higher spiritual awareness that flowed through him. He reported that he had been looking for a teacher but realized through his awakening that the teacher he sought was within him.

Meeker lectured, taught, and practiced Attunement in various locations in North America from 1929 to 1945. He wrote under the pen name Uranda, and he was known to his followers by that name. In 1945 Meeker established his headquarters at Sunrise Ranch, which was a dryland farm at the time. From 1952 to 1954 he conducted six-month Servers Training School classes at Sunrise Ranch, teaching Attunement and the spiritual understanding behind the practice, as well as practical spirituality. These classes were attended by people from many backgrounds and included GPC (God-Patient-Chiropractor) chiropractors, led by a former Major League Baseball pitcher, George Shears, and others.

In 1954 Meeker died in a plane crash in San Francisco Bay with his wife, Kathy Meeker. A close associate of Meeker’s, Albert Ackerley, and two children also died in the crash. Lord Martin Cecil (1909-1988), who had worked closely with Meeker, assumed the responsibility for leading Emissaries of Divine Light from 1954 until he died in 1988. Lord Martin succeeded his older brother to become The 7th Marquess of Exeter in October 1981.

Development under Lord Martin Cecil's leadership
Lord Martin Cecil was the second son of William Cecil, 5th Marquess of Exeter and was descended from William Cecil, 1st Baron Burghley, chief adviser to Queen Elizabeth I. He led a ranching operation on his family’s property in the Cariboo country of British Columbia. In 1948, Cecil formed a spiritual community at 100 Mile House, BC. On the death of his brother, David Cecil, 6th Marquess of Exeter, in October 1981, he became The 7th Marquess of Exeter and a member of the House of Lords of the United Kingdom. However, he never spoke in the House.

Under Lord Martin's leadership, the network grew to about 4,000 adherents. Many young people, disenchanted with the Vietnam War and inspired by the idealism of the 1960s and ’70s, were drawn to his message and the network that was growing around him. Twelve centers developed around the world, and numerous other nonprofit organizations were birthed by participants in Emissaries of Divine Light. These included an outdoor adventure educational organization, Educo; an association of spiritually based business people, Renaissance Business Associates; an association of media professionals, Association for Responsible Communication; an association of educators, Renaissance Educational Associates; and Emissary Foundation International.

Bill Bahan became an important leader and teacher for Emissaries of Divine Light in the ’60s, ’70s, and early ’80s, offering classes at Sunrise Ranch; Epping, New Hampshire; and Livingston Manor, New York. He was a nephew of George Shears, D.C., leader of the G-P-C Chiropractic Movement. Bill and his brother, Walter Bahan (also active in the Emissary program), along with three other brothers (all five chiropractors), operated the Bahan and Bahan Chiropractic Clinics in Salem and Derry, New Hampshire, using GPC principles. Bill founded the Whole Health Institute, an association of healthcare professionals promoting wholistic health. They hosted conferences and lectures around the world, and published the journal Healing Currents. In Bill's words, "Health is the unhindered expression of life through the body, truth through the mind, and love through the heart."

Transition after Lord Exeter's death
When Lord Exeter died in January 1988, his son, Michael Cecil, 8th Marquess of Exeter (formerly known as Lord Burghley), became the leader of Emissaries of Divine Light until he left the organization in 1996. In that eight-year period, much of the leadership left the organization, including most of the children of both Lloyd Arthur Meeker and Martin Cecil, 7th Marquess of Exeter, who had been prominent in the network. From 1988 to 1996, more than two-thirds of the participants in Emissaries of Divine Light left as well. Many ex-members became bitter about their experience and launched accusations against the organization.  One member, Robert Coates, even began playing football in one of the group's most sacred spaces.

As the 8th Marquess of Exeter resigned from his position in 1996, a group of trustees assumed responsibility for the leadership of the network. They set in place ethical guidelines throughout the network and addressed grievances brought to them by participants. They sought to bring the universal truths taught by Lloyd Arthur Meeker into contemporary language and practice.

Recent history
In the 1990s, Emissaries of Divine Light developed new programs for spiritual understanding and personal development. Deepening Spiritual Expression and The Opening are week-long residential programs that are still offered by the organization. They also developed Attunement Practitioner certification training, which is available at many Emissary centers.

In August 2004, the trustees of Emissaries of Divine Light named David Karchere as the leader of the global network. In 2008, David Karchere and Jane Anetrini developed and taught a year-long leadership program based on the teachings of Emissaries of Divine Light. A second session of the program was conducted in 2009 and 2010. In 2012 they initiated a new series of seminars under the title Practical Spirituality: An Operator’s Guide to Being Human, led by David Karchere.

Sunrise Ranch
The headquarters of Emissaries of Divine Light was established in 1945 at Sunrise Ranch in Loveland, Colorado, now a conference and retreat center staffed by a community of eighty-five people. Sunrise Ranch hosts workshops, seminars and retreats intended to offer the participants fresh thinking and understanding, leading to a direct experience of spiritual renewal. There are seven other major centers around the world for Emissaries of Divine Light, each offering programs with a similar approach.

Sunrise Ranch also offers residential work-study programs in practical spirituality, which it defines as the application of universal spiritual principles to the common issues of human life. These include a program designed for personal spiritual renewal, called Full Self Emergence, and a Permaculture Design Course for people interested in sustainable human systems and sustainable agriculture.

Creative Field Project
The trustees of Emissaries of Divine Light lead the Creative Field Project. The project is an exploration of the power of human intention to influence the field of energy held by a group of people. The Creative Field Project began in 2009 with a network of small groups around the world that meet monthly by telephone. It included the first Creative Field Conference in 2011 at Sunrise Ranch that featured Lynne McTaggart, who wrote The Field; and American priest and theologian Matthew Fox. In 2012, Emissaries of Divine Light joined with the Novalis Ubuntu Institute in Cape Town, South Africa, to host the Creative Field Conference—South Africa: Your Destiny Is Calling.

Teaching and practices
Emissaries of Divine Light teach that the key to creative living is the individual’s openness to the source of universal power and intelligence within them, and that human emotions either connect a person to that source or cut them off from it. The educational programs of the Emissaries are designed to assist people to find out what has been emotionally triggering them, so that they can withdraw their emotional attention from the trigger and turn it to the life force within them. The Emissaries believe that behind all emotions is the universal power of love and a universal intelligence that bring spiritual enlightenment. They teach that through deliberate conscious thought a person can let their own emotional current purify, so that they open themselves to the flow of the universal power and intelligence within them.

The One Law

The central teaching of Emissaries of Divine Light is referred to as The One Law. They describe it as a law of cause and effect. They see the causative factor in spiritual regeneration as the universal power and intelligence within all people, and the effect in human experience as dependent on the response to that internal reality. They describe the creative process in human experience as the working of The One Law in a sequence of five stages: radiation, response, attraction, union and unified radiation. Their seminars claim to assist people to withdraw their energetic response from the circumstances around them and direct it to the power and intelligence within them.

Emissaries of Divine Light describe the process of personal spiritual renewal as Full Self Emergence because they believe that a person is renewed when their own divine selfhood is expressed through their mind, emotions and their body. They use the story of the Seven Days of Creation in Genesis as a symbolic template for the process of spiritual renewal in the life of the individual, and for humankind as a whole.

Attunement

Attunement is a central practice of Emissaries of Divine Light. The origin of the word Attunement refers to the attuning of the human capacity with the universal animating spirit within all people. Attunement practitioners believe that positive shifts in consciousness release a healing energy through a person’s body, mind and emotions.

Emissaries of Divine Light practice Attunement as a form of energy medicine. Attunement practitioners believe that universal life energy is conveyed to the client through the hands of the practitioner. The primary contact points for the client receiving the Attunement are the endocrine glands. Attunement practitioners teach that the endocrine glands are portals for universal life energy that operates through the physical body, and through the mental and emotional function of the individual.

Emissaries of Divine Light also teach Attunement as a personal spiritual practice. They believe it is a central factor in the conscious evolution of humanity.

Leadership
Emissaries of Divine Light is led by David Karchere, who is the spiritual director of the organization, and six other trustees. Karchere lives, writes and teaches at Sunrise Ranch, and travels in North America, Europe, Africa and Australia, offering programs on practical spirituality and Attunement.

The trustees are elected by an International Emissary Congress with representatives from Emissary organizations around the world. Currently, the trustees are Jane Anetrini, Ruth Buckingham, Hugh Duff, David Karchere, Marilyn Manderson, Phil Richardson and Maureen Waller.

Major centers
In addition to their international headquarters at Sunrise Ranch, Emissaries of Divine Light used to operate Glen Ivy in Corona, California, as a conference and retreat center and an Attunement teaching center. Glen Ivy is also a natural mineral springs. The Emissaries leased the mineral springs and the spa property adjacent to their center to Glen Ivy Hot Springs, a popular destination in Southern California. The property was sold in 2016.

These are the major centers for Emissaries of Divine Light around the world:

Edenvale, Abbotsford, British Columbia, Canada
Gate House, Constantia, South Africa
Riverdell, Gawler, South Australia, Australia
Sunrise Ranch, Loveland, Colorado, USA

Publications
Beginning in the 1930s, Emissaries of Divine Light have continually published their writings and teachings and circulated these to their membership. In 1936, Lloyd A. Meeker published his seven-week meditation guide, Seven Steps to the Temple of Light, as well as his correspondence course, Steps to Mastership. In the 1980s, Martin Cecil published eighteen volumes of his own writing and the writings of Lloyd Meeker under the title The Third Sacred School.

For most of its history, weekly talks and writings of Emissary leadership have been distributed by regular mail. Since 2005, the organization has circulated a weekly e-mail message, The Pulse of Spirit, authored by David Karchere and other current leaders of the network. In 2010 they began to publish the Journal of the Creative Field.

See also
 Divine light

References

External links 

Spiritual organizations